The Adcox Cloud Buster was a two-seat sporting biplane built by the students of the US Adcox Aviation Trade School in 1931.  It was originally powered by a Salmson AD-9 engine of 40 hp (30 kW).

A single example was built, changing owners (and engines) several times before it was scrapped in 1938.

Cloud Buster
Single-engined tractor aircraft
Biplanes
1930s United States sport aircraft